Dolgoma striata is a moth of the family Erebidae. It was described by Vladimir Viktorovitch Dubatolov in 2012 and is endemic to Vietnam.

The forewings are dark yellow, dusted with diffuse brown dots. The forewings of the females are more strongly suffused with brown dots. The hindwings are unicolorous light yellow.

References

External links

Moths described in 2012
Endemic fauna of Vietnam
striata